The Task teaching style is an option available to students under Student-Directed Teaching, a progressive teaching technology that aims to give the student a greater sense of ownership in his or her own education.

This teaching style is "for those students who required formal instruction and yet are capable of making some choice as to the appropriate practice for them to master the objective." This formal instruction happens at the same time as the Command students.

Under Task, the teacher will:

Provide a unit plan consisting of the objectives for several days, written in a language that students can understand
Provide formal instruction
Limit formal instruction to 25% of the time
Provide an instruction area
Assign an appropriate amount of choice in practice related to the instruction
Provide a checking station with answer keys
Use good questioning techniques and negotiation to help steer the students to becoming more independent
Spend approximately 60% of the total class time with the students whose choice was Task (remember Command and Task are together for formal instruction)
Provide perception checks and final tests as indicated in the unit plan
Provide a second evaluative activity if required by an individual student

The student will:

Listen to the instruction
Consider what they know and what they don't know when selecting the amount and type of practice
Declare the mark expected on each perception check
Do more than one perception check if the declared mark is not reached within the flexibility factor

Assignments for students choosing Task style might look something like this:

On page 159 there are some practice questions. Do any 3 of the first 5, any 2 of the next 5 and any 4 of the next 10.

References

Pedagogy